The Çakıt Tunnel, is a motorway tunnel constructed on the Ankara–Tarsus motorway   in Adana Province, southern Turkey.

It is situated on the Taurus Mountains near Ömerli village of Pozantı, Adana. The -long twin-tube tunnel carrying three lanes of traffic in each direction is flanked by -long Kırkgeçit-7 Tunnel in the north and -long Gülek Tunnel in the south on the same motorway. Dangerous goods carriers are not permitted to use the tunnel.

See also
List of motorway tunnels in Turkey
Kırkgeçit Tunnels

References

External links
 Map of road tunnels in Turkey at General Directorate of Highways (Turkey) (KGM)

Road tunnels in Turkey
Transport in Adana Province